Jamall Johnson (born October 12, 1982) is a former gridiron football linebacker and actor. He was signed by the Cleveland Browns as an undrafted free agent in 2005 and was also a member of the Hamilton Tiger-Cats, Tampa Bay Buccaneers, and BC Lions. He played college football at Northwestern State and high school football at Destrehan High School.

Since leaving football he has become an actor in Vancouver, BC. He is known for Robin Roberts Presents: Mahalia (2021), Wendy Williams: The Movie and Chateau Christmas (2020).

College career
He went to Delta State University and Northwestern State University, where he earned a degree in Business Administration. He played college football and continued his career with the CFL.

Professional career

Cleveland Browns
Johnson was signed as an undrafted free agent by the Browns in 2005 but was waived before training camp.

BC Lions
Johnson was signed as a free agent by the BC Lions in 2005. In 2005, he played 5 games, had 7 total tackles and made a key forced fumble in the 2005 West Division Final versus the Edmonton Eskimos. In 2006, Johnson recorded 12 total tackles and a 39-yard fumble recovery. He played during BC's victory in the 2006 Grey Cup.

Tampa Bay Buccaneers
Johnson was signed to a future contract by the Tampa Bay Buccaneers on December 31, 2008. He was released on June 19, 2009.

Hamilton Tiger-Cats
Johnson signed with the Hamilton Tiger-Cats on July 4, 2009.

BC Lions
Johnson was signed as a free agent by the BC Lions on February 13, 2014.

References

External links
BC Lions bio 
Hamilton Tiger-Cats bio
Tampa Bay Buccaneers bio

1982 births
Living people
People from Norco, Louisiana
African-American players of Canadian football
American football linebackers
American football safeties
American players of Canadian football
BC Lions players
Canadian football linebackers
Cleveland Browns players
Delta State Statesmen football players
Hamilton Tiger-Cats players
Northwestern State Demons football players
Destrehan High School alumni
Players of American football from Louisiana
Tampa Bay Buccaneers players
21st-century African-American sportspeople
20th-century African-American people